Bogdan Igorevich Ovsyannikov (born 5 January 1999) is a Russian football player. He plays for PFC Krylia Sovetov Samara.

Club career
He made his debut in the Russian Professional Football League for FC Krylia Sovetov-2 Samara on 27 July 2017 in a game against FC Volga Ulyanovsk. He made his debut for the main squad of PFC Krylia Sovetov Samara on 25 September 2019 in a Russian Cup game against FC Torpedo Moscow. He made his Russian Football National League debut for Krylia Sovetov on 9 October 2020 against FC Tekstilshchik Ivanovo.

Ovsyannikov made his Russian Premier League debut for Krylia Sovetov on 14 May 2022 against FC Akhmat Grozny.

Career statistics

References

External links
 
 
 

1999 births
Sportspeople from Nizhny Novgorod
Living people
Russian footballers
Association football goalkeepers
PFC Krylia Sovetov Samara players
Russian First League players
Russian Second League players
Russian Premier League players
Russian expatriate footballers
Expatriate footballers in Portugal
Russian expatriate sportspeople in Portugal